Telecommunications in North Korea refers to the communication services available in North Korea. North Korea has not fully adopted mainstream Internet technology due to its isolationist policies.

Telephone

North Korea has an adequate telephone system, with 1.18 million fixed lines available in 2008. However, most phones are only installed for senior government officials. Someone wanting a phone installed must fill out a form indicating their rank, why they want a phone, and how they will pay for it. Most of these are installed in government offices, collective farms, and state-owned enterprises (SOEs), with only perhaps 10 percent controlled by individuals or households.
By 1970 automatic switching facilities were in use in Pyongyang, Sinŭiju, Hamhŭng, and Hyesan. A few public telephone booths were beginning to appear in Pyongyang around 1990. In the mid-1990s, an automated exchange system based on an E-10A
system produced by Alcatel joint-venture factories in China was installed in Pyongyang. North Koreans announced in
1997 that automated switching had replaced manual switching in Pyongyang and 70 other locales.
North Korean press reported in 2000 that fiber-optic cable had been extended to the port of Nampho and that North Pyong'an Province had been connected with fiber-optic cable.

Mobile phones

In November 2002, mobile phones were introduced to North Korea and by November 2003, 20,000 North Koreans had bought mobile phones.

There was a ban on cell phones from 2004 to 2008.

In December 2008, a new mobile phone service was launched in Pyongyang, operated by Egyptian company Orascom, but the North Korean government immediately expropriated control of the enterprise and its earnings. The official name of the 3G mobile phone service in North Korea is called Koryolink, and is now effectively under the control of the state-owned Korea Post and Telecommunications Corporation (KPTC). There has been a large demand for the service since it was launched.

In May 2010, more than 120,000 North Koreans owned mobile phones; this number had increased to 301,000 by September 2010, 660,000 by August 2011, and 900,000 by December 2011. Orascom reported 432,000 North Korean subscribers after two years of operation (December 2010), increasing to 809,000 by September 2011, and exceeding one million by February 2012. By April 2013 subscriber numbers neared two million. By 2015 the figure had grown to three million.

In 2011, 60% of Pyongyang's citizens between the age of 20 and 50 had a cellphone. On June 15, 2011, StatCounter.com confirmed that some North Koreans use Apple's iPhones, as well as Nokia's and Samsung's smartphones.

In November 2020, no mobile phones could dial into or out of the country, and there was  no Internet connection. A 3G network covered 94 percent of the population, but only 14 percent of the territory.

Koryolink has no international roaming agreements.  Pre-paid SIM cards can be purchased by visitors to North Korea to make international (but not domestic) calls.  Prior to January 2013, foreigners had to surrender their phones at the border crossing or airport before entering the country, but with the availability of local SIM cards this policy is no longer in place.  Internet access, however, is only available to resident foreigners and not tourists.

North Korean mobile phones use a digital signature system to prevent access to unsanctioned files, and log usage information that can be physically inspected.

A survey in 2017 found that 69% of households had a mobile phone.

In September 2019 a previously unknown company Kwangya Trading Company (광야무역회사의) announced the release of a cell phone for North Korean consumer use called the Kimtongmu. Although state-run media reports that the phone was developed by North Korean outlets it is likely sourced rather from a Chinese OEM and outfitted with North Korean software.

International connection
North Korea has had a varying number of connections to other nations. Currently, international fixed line connections consist of a network connecting Pyongyang to Beijing and Moscow, and Chongjin to Vladivostok. Communications were opened with South Korea in 2000. In May 2006 TransTeleCom Company and North Korea's Ministry of Communications have signed an agreement for the construction and joint operation of a fiber-optic transmission line in the section of the Khasan–Tumangang railway checkpoint in the North Korea-Russia border. This is the first direct land link between Russia and North Korea. TTC's partner in the design, construction, and connection of the communication line from the Korean side to the junction was Korea Communication Company of North Korea's Ministry of Communications. The technology transfer was built around STM-1 level digital equipment with the possibility of further increasing bandwidth. The construction was completed in 2007.

Since joining Intersputnik in 1984, North Korea has operated 22 lines of frequency-division multiplexing and 10 lines of single channel per carrier for communication with Eastern Europe. and in late 1989 international direct dialing service through microwave link was introduced from Hong Kong. A satellite ground station near Pyongyang provides direct international communications using the International Telecommunications Satellite Corporation (Intelsat) Indian Ocean satellite. A satellite communications center was installed in Pyongyang in 1986 with French technical support. An agreement to share in Japan's telecommunications satellites was reached in 1990. North Korea joined the Universal Postal Union in 1974 but has direct postal arrangements with only a select group of countries.

Fiber optic lines
Following the agreement with UNDP, the Pyongyang Fiber Optic Cable Factory was
built in April 1992 and the country's first optical fiber cable network consisting of 480
pulse-code modulation (PCM) lines and 6 automatic exchange stations from Pyongyang
to Hamhung (300 kilometers) was installed in September 1995. Moreover, the nationwide land leveling and rezoning campaign initiated by Kim Jong-il in Kangwon province in May 1998 and in North Pyongan province in January 2000 facilitated the construction of provincial and county fiber optic lines, which were laid by tens of thousands of Korean People's Army (KPA) soldier-builders and provincial shock brigade members mobilized for the large-scale public works projects designed to rehabilitate the hundreds of thousands of hectares of arable lands devastated by the natural disasters in the late 1990s.

Television

Broadcasting in North Korea is tightly controlled by the state and is used as a propaganda arm of the ruling Korean Workers' Party. The Korean Central Television station is located in Pyongyang, and there are also stations in major cities, including Chŏngjin, Hamhŭng, Haeju, Kaesŏng, Sinŭiju, Wŏnsan. There are four channels in Pyongyang but only one channel in other cities. Imported Japanese-made color televisions have a North Korean brand name superimposed, but nineteen-inch black-and-white sets have been produced locally since 1980. One estimate placed the total number of television sets in use in the early 1990s at 250,000 sets. A study in 2017 found that 98% of households had a TV set.

Radio

Visitors are not allowed to bring a radio. As part of the government's information blockade policy, North Korean radios and televisions must be modified to receive only government stations. These modified radios and televisions should be registered at special state department. They are also subject to inspection at random. The removal of the official seal is punishable by law. In order to buy a TV-set or a radio, North Korean citizens are required to get special permission from officials at their places of residence or employment.

North Korea has two AM radio broadcasting networks,  (Voice of Korea) and Korean Central Broadcasting Station, and one FM network, . All three networks have stations in major cities that offer local programming. There also is a powerful shortwave transmitter for overseas broadcasts in several languages.

The official government station is the Korean Central Broadcasting Station (KCBS), which broadcasts in Korean. In 1997 there were 3.36 million radio sets.

Internet

National area network

Kwangmyong is a North Korean "walled garden" national intranet opened in 2000. It is accessible from within North Korea's major cities, counties, as well as universities and major industrial and commercial organizations. Kwangmyong has 24-hour unlimited access by dial-up telephone line. A survey in 2017 found that 19% of households had a computer, but that only 1% nationally and 5% in Pyongyang had access to the internet.

In August 2016, it was reported that North Korea had launched a state-approved video streaming service which has been likened to Netflix. The service, known as "Manbang" (meaning everyone) uses a set-top box to stream live TV, on-demand video and newspaper articles (from the state newspaper Rodong Sinmun) over the internet. The service is only available to citizens in Pyongyang, Siniju and Sariwon. The state TV channel Korean Central Television (KCTV) described the service as a "respite from radio interference".

In 2018, North Korea unveiled a new Wi-Fi service called Mirae ("Future"), which allowed mobile devices to access the internet network in Pyongyang.

During the COVID-19 pandemic the Rakwon video conferencing system, developed at Kim Il-sung University, became popular for remote meetings, and appeared regularly on news bulletins. Telemedicine and remote education systems have been developed.

International Internet access 

North Korea's main connection to the international Internet is through a fiber-optic cable connecting Pyongyang with
Dandong, China, crossing the China–North Korea border at Sinuiju. Internet access is provided by China Unicom. Before the fiber connection, international Internet access was limited to government-approved dial-up over land lines to China. In 2003 a joint venture between businessman Jan Holterman in Berlin and the North Korean government called KCC Europe brought the commercial Internet to North Korea. The connection was established through an Intelsat satellite link from North Korea to servers located in Germany. This link ended the need to dial ISPs in China.

In 2007 North Korea successfully applied at ICANN for the .kp country code top-level domain (ccTLD). KCC Europe administered the domain from Berlin, and also hosted a large number of websites .

In 2009 Internet service provider Star Joint Venture Co., a joint venture between the North Korean government's Post and Telecommunications Corporation and Thailand-based Loxley Pacific, took control of North Korea's Internet and address allocation. The satellite link was phased out in favour of the fiber connection and is currently only used as a backup line.

In October 2017 a large scale DDoS attack on the main China connection led to a second Internet connection taken into service. This connects North Korea through a fiber optic cable with Vladivostok, crossing the Russia-North Korea border at Tumangang. Internet access is provided by TransTelekom, a subsidiary of Russian national railway operator Russian Railways.

North Korea's first Internet café opened in 2002 as a joint venture with South Korean Internet company Hoonnet. It is connected via a land line to China. Foreign visitors can link their computers to the Internet through international phone lines available in a few hotels in Pyongyang. In 2005 a new Internet café opened in Pyongyang, connected not through China, but through the North Korean satellite link. Content is most likely filtered by North Korean government agencies.

Since February 2013, foreigners have been able to access the internet using the 3G phone network.

Access to foreign media
"A Quiet Opening: North Koreans in a Changing Media Environment", a study commissioned by the U.S. State Department and conducted by Intermedia and released May 10, 2012 shows that despite extremely strict regulations and draconian penalties North Koreans, particularly elite elements, have increasing access to news and other media outside the state-controlled media authorized by the government. While access to the Internet is tightly controlled, radio and DVDs are common media accessed, and in border areas, television.

As of 2011, USB flash drives were selling well in North Korea, primarily used for watching South Korean dramas and films on personal computers.

See also

 Censorship in North Korea
 Media of North Korea
 Radio jamming in Korea
 North Korean postal service

References

External links
North Korea Uncovered , (North Korea Google Earth) See most of North Korea's communications facilities, including: The Korea Computer Center, the Pyongyang Television Tower, the KCBS tower, the major communications center in Heaju, as well as satellite communications stations near Pyongyang.

 
North Korea
North Korea